Kagimoto is a Japanese surname. 

Notable people with the surname include:

, Japanese singer and member of hip-hop group Lead
, Japanese table tennis player

Japanese-language surnames